Mazaea is a genus of flowering plants in the family Rubiaceae. It is endemic to Cuba.

Species
 Mazaea phialanthoides (Griseb.) Krug & Urb.
 Mazaea shaferi (Standl.) Delprete

External links
Mazaea in the World Checklist of Rubiaceae

Rubiaceae genera
Rondeletieae